758 Mancunia is a minor planet orbiting the Sun. It was discovered in 1912 from Johannesburg by H. E. Wood, a Mancunian. The orbital plane is inclined at an angle of 5.61° to the plane of the ecliptic.

Observation of this asteroid in 1996 suggested a rotation period of 6.902 hours. However, radar observations from Arecibo indicated this may be in error. A high radar albedo indicates this object is most likely metallic. Dips in the radar echo suggests there are large concavities on both sides.

References

External links 
 Lightcurve plot of 758 Mancunia, Palmer Divide Observatory, B. D. Warner (2006)
 Asteroid Lightcurve Database (LCDB), query form (info )
 Dictionary of Minor Planet Names, Google books
 Asteroids and comets rotation curves, CdR – Observatoire de Genève, Raoul Behrend
 Discovery Circumstances: Numbered Minor Planets (1)-(5000) – Minor Planet Center
 
 

Background asteroids
Mancunia
Mancunia
X-type asteroids (Tholen)
19120518